In the colony of New South Wales, Australia, a muster was an extension of a Military Muster to the general populace.
A general muster was held when deemed necessary to count the convicts and general population. Many people were not included. 
Musters were held in the years:

 1788 A list of persons victualled in NSW and Norfolk Island
 1806 A General Muster in NSW of convicts, emancipists, livestock and land.
 1810 to 1820  Returns of convicts in the Colony on 1 January 1810 and of those who arrived up until September 1820.
 1811 A General Muster in NSW, Port Dalrymple, Hobart Town and Norfolk Island 
 1814 A General Muster was held in NSW which was arranged by districts.
 1818 Muster of free persons at Hobart Town.
 1819 Muster of persons at Hobart Town and Port Dalrymple.
 1820 and 1821 Muster of convicts and their children at Hobart Town.
 1822 Muster supplying alphabetical returns of persons in NSW and also of convicts in Van Diemen's Land.
 1823 Muster of convicts in Van Diemen's Land.
 1825 General muster of all inhabitants in NSW, except the military.
 1837 General muster of all convicts in NSW and Norfolk Island.
 1841 Censuses of NSW, Adelaide, Van Diemen's Land and Port Phillip.
 1891 Census of NSW.

References

History of New South Wales